The 1993 NSWRL season (known as the 1993 Winfield Cup Premiership for sponsorship reasons) was the eighty-sixth season of professional rugby league football in Australia. The New South Wales Rugby League's sixteen teams competed for the J. J. Giltinan Shield during the season, which culminated in a replay of the previous year's grand final for the Winfield Cup trophy between the Brisbane Broncos and St. George Dragons. As Sydney celebrated winning the 2000 Olympic Games, Brisbane spoiled the party by retaining the NSWRL premiership.

Season summary
This season the 10-metre rule was introduced, which required the defensive team to retreat 10 metres from where the ball is being played, allowing more room for attacking players.

On 16 June the Gold Coast club was fined $50,000 for exceeding their 1992 salary cap by $150,000.

On 22 August, the Canberra Raiders beat the Parramatta Eels 68-nil.  As of 2021 this is still the biggest winning margin where the losing team has been kept scoreless.

The Canberra Raiders' Ricky Stuart won both the Rothmans Medal and Dally M Medal as the best and fairest player in the League in 1993, while Steve Walters, also from the Raiders, was named Rugby League Week's player of the year.

A total of twenty-two regular season rounds were played from March till August, resulting in a top five of Canterbury, St. George, Canberra, Manly and Brisbane who would go on to battle it out in the finals.

The winners in all grades were:

  Brisbane Broncos (Senior Grade)
  North Sydney Bears (Reserve Grade)
  Eastern Suburbs Roosters (Under-21s Grade)

Teams
The lineup of teams remained unchanged from the previous season, with sixteen clubs contesting the premiership, including five Sydney-based foundation teams, another six from Sydney, two from greater New South Wales, two from Queensland, and one from the Australian Capital Territory.

Advertising
For the second year running the NSWRL and its advertising agency Hertz Walpole used the 1992 re-recording of "The Best" by Tina Turner and Jimmy Barnes which had been released as "Simply the Best", the title by which the song was more popularly known in Australia.

No new Tina footage was available until she came to Australia at the season's end, so further shots were taken from the 1992 Tina and Jimmy black & white film clip that accompanied the song's release and used in amongst the usual previous season action and pre-season training images.

The League and Winfield enjoyed additional advertising exposure late in the season when Tina aligned an Australian leg of her 1993 tour with the NSWRL's final series. She performed on-stage at the Grand Final, presented the victor's trophy and performed the next week in a number of full-scale rock'n'roll shows with her band at the Sydney Entertainment Centre.

Ladder

Balmain were stripped of 2 competition points due to an illegal replacement in one game.

Finals
With one round remaining the Canberra Raiders were outright first on the ladder and favoured to participate in their 4th grand final in just 5 years.  This was not to be however as a horrific leg injury sidelined Ricky Stuart for the last round of competition and the finals series.  The Raiders went on to lose to Canterbury in round 22 of the competition and then to Brisbane and St George in the finals, all of which they had beat easily during the preceding season.  By the end of the season there were only two points separating 1st and 5th.  Week one of the finals saw St George easily account for the Canberra Raiders whilst Brisbane brushed aside Manly on their march through to week two.  Canberra went into this game with their third halves combination in as many weeks and were unable to overcome the eventual premiers, succumbing to Brisbane 30–12. St. George beat Minor Premiers' Canterbury in the semi-final then had a week off to prepare for a Grand Final rematch with Brisbane who advanced through after beating Canterbury in a close and spiteful Preliminary Final.

Chart

Grand Final
For the second year running Brisbane and St George played out the decider. The Broncos had momentum coming into the final, with only one loss in their last six matches. Even though that loss was to St. George in the final regular season round, Brisbane remained favourites. The sides for the grand final replay were largely unchanged between the two years. Only one Bronco (Peter Ryan) had not played in the 1992 grand final and four of the Dragons (Jason Stevens, Nathan Brown, Gorden Tallis and Phil Blake). It was also Glenn Lazarus' fifth consecutive Grand Final appearance, having appeared the previous year's for Brisbane and the three years' before that with Canberra. And it was also David Barnhill's fifth consecutive Grand Final appearance, having appeared the previous year's for St. George and the three years' before that also with Canberra. In the pre-match performance, Tina Turner performed "The Best" on stage at the Sydney Football Stadium alongside her saxophonist, US session musician Timmy Cappello. A ground record crowd for the Sydney Football Stadium of 42,239 was on hand for the match.

First half
During the first minute of the game, St. George prop Jason Stevens suffered a badly broken thumb and would take no further part in the match. Later, following a Tony Priddle error, the Broncos opened the scoring in the twenty-first minute after Kevin Walters threw a dummy thirty metres out and sliced through the St. George line then passed back inside to Chris Johns who dived over. Julian ONeill converted the try so Brisbane led 6 - 0. About seven minutes later it was Kevin Walters again who set up Terry Matterson on his inside to cross for a soft try from close range,
 and ONeill missed his kick so Brisbane led 10 – 0 with seven minutes of the first half remaining. About two minutes away from half-time Andrew Gee gave St. George a penalty in the ruck and they decided to take the two points, meaning the score at the break was 10 - 2 in favour of the Broncos.

Second half
St. George opened the scoring in the second half, again with an Ian Herron kick following a penalty from Andrew Gee, bringing the deficit back to a converted try at 10 - 4. Brisbane withstood further raids from the Dragons and when another penalty was awarded to St. George in front of the posts they again took the two points, with Herron making it three from three so the score was 10 - 6 in favour of the Broncos with just over three-quarters of the match gone. However, these would be the last points the Dragons would score with the Broncos getting in close to St. Georges line before passing the ball out to Willie Carne on the right wing to dive over in the corner for the game's third try in the sixty-eighth minute. ONeill missed the sideline conversion attempt so the score was 14 - 6 with under ten minutes of the match remaining. There were no more points before the full-time siren, so this would remain the final score.

Brisbane Broncos 14Tries: Johns, Matterson, CarneGoals: Matterson 1/3
St. George Dragons 6Goals: Herron 3/3
Clive Churchill Medal: Brad Mackay (St. George)

After the match Tina Turner presented the trophy to Allan Langer and joined in Brisbane's post-game victory song. Despite being on the losing side, Dragons lock Brad Mackay was chosen by NSWRL General Manager John Quayle, Don Furner and two St. George legends, John Raper and Reg Gasnier to be awarded the Clive Churchill Medal as man-of-the-match, with Queensland premier Wayne Goss questioning the decision. By retaining their title Brisbane had also become the first team in history to win a premiership from fifth spot. The match also drew remarkably strong ratings nationwide.

Player statistics
The following statistics are as of the conclusion of Round 22.

Top 5 point scorers

Top 5 try scorers

Top 5 goal scorers

Attendances
The regular season attendances for the 1993 season aggregated to a total of 2,625,467 at an average of 14,426 per game.

Due to a sponsorship dispute between the Castlemaine XXXX sponsored Queensland Rugby League and the Powers Brewery sponsored Brisbane Broncos, the defending premiers moved from the 32,500 capacity Lang Park to the 59,000 capacity ANZ Stadium for 1993. At the host venue of the 1982 Commonwealth Games, the Broncos set a new league record average home attendance of 43,200. This was almost 27,000 more than the next best for the season set by Canterbury-Bankstown.

The highest ten regular season match attendances:

See also
1993 State of Origin series

References

External links
Rugby League Tables - Season 1993 The World of Rugby League
1993 J J Giltinan Shield and Winfield Cup at rleague.com
NSWRL season 1993 at rugbyleagueproject.com
Results:1991-2000 at rabbitohs.com.au

New South Wales Rugby League premiership
NSWRL season